James Sutcliffe Heap (12 August 1882 – 30 January 1951) was an English cricketer active from 1903 to 1921 who played for Lancashire after graduating from the Lancashire League where he played for his hometown club, Lowerhouse.  He was born in Burnley and died in Bolton. He appeared in 211 first-class matches as a lefthanded batsman who bowled slow left arm orthodox.   Heap had a “beautiful natural action”. He often suffered from severe lumbago which affected his bowling.

He scored 5,146 runs at an average of 18.98 with a highest score of 132* and held 74 catches. He took 412 wickets with a best analysis of nine for 43.  He saved his best performances for the Roses Match - in 1909 he recorded figures of 11/95 and 11/35 in 1910.   Lancashire organised a benefit for him in his final season, 1921, which realised £1,804.

Notes

1882 births
1951 deaths
English cricketers
Lancashire cricketers